The Botanical Garden of the University of Zurich (German: Botanischer Garten der Universität Zürich) is a botanical garden in the Swiss city of Zurich. It was opened in 1977 and is located at Zollikerstrasse in the Weinegg quarter of the city.

The garden should not be mistaken for the Old Botanical Garden, located on the former zur Katz bastion in the city centre, which is also owned by the University of Zurich.

External links 

Parks in Zürich
Botanical gardens in Switzerland
Cultural property of national significance in the canton of Zürich
University of Zurich
District 8 of Zürich